Sunset is a former Rochester Industrial and Rapid Transit Railway station located in Brighton, New York. It was closed in 1956 along with the rest of the line. 

This station was built at Sunset Drive in a cutting that had once been the bed of the Erie Canal and is now a section of the Interstate 590 highway.

References

 

Buildings and structures in Brighton, Monroe County, New York
Rochester Subway stations
Railway stations in the United States opened in 1918
Railway stations closed in 1956
1918 establishments in New York (state)
1956 disestablishments in New York (state)